Wingham (Canterbury Road) railway station  was a terminus on the East Kent Light Railway. It opened in 1925 (named Wingham) and the last passenger train ran on 30 October 1948. There was a siding to the south of the road, and carriages were usually run into the station under gravity. Occasional freight/parcel trains ran until 1950 but the station was not officially closed until 1951.
After closure the cutting containing the station was infilled and covered with a field of crops. The site of the sidings are now occupied by a tea shop adjacent to which is a short section of undisturbed trackbed.

References

Sources
 

Disused railway stations in Kent
Former East Kent Light Railway stations
Railway stations in Great Britain opened in 1925
Railway stations in Great Britain closed in 1948